Accenture Tower (500 West Madison) is a 42-story, 588-foot (180 m) skyscraper in Chicago, Illinois. Located between Clinton and Canal Streets on Madison Street, the structure was designed by the architecture firm Murphy/Jahn in a late modernist style. The building, previously named the Northwestern Atrium Center and Citigroup Center, was constructed between 1984 and 1987 on the air rights obtained by the destruction of the head house of the 1911 North Western Station. The building contains retail and offices, and is connected to the platforms of Ogilvie Transportation Center.

On July 10, 2019, the building was officially renamed to Accenture Tower after a commitment from Accenture PLC.

Shooting 

On 8 December 2006 a man opened fire in a law office located on the 38th floor of the Citigroup Center. Four people, including the gunman, were killed. One person survived.

See also 

 List of buildings
 List of skyscrapers
 List of tallest buildings in Chicago
 List of tallest buildings in the United States
 World's tallest structures

References

External links
 

Skyscraper office buildings in Chicago
Citigroup buildings
Bank buildings in Illinois
Headquarters in the United States
Helmut Jahn buildings
1987 establishments in Illinois
Office buildings completed in 1987